Zrní is a Czech alternative rock band from Kladno. 

Their first album, Voní, was released in 2009 after the band had already been together for eight years. Their second album, Hrdina počítačový hry jde do světa, was released in 2011 by the famous songwriter Radůza on her label Radůza Records. In 2012 the band released the album Soundtrack ke konci světa. It was nominated for both the 2012 Vinyla and Apollo awards for Album of the Year, and was also nominated in four categories at the 2012 Anděl Awards. It won the Anděl Award for Discovery of the Year. In September 2014, their album Následuj kojota was nominated for Album of the Year at the Apollo Awards, and it received three nominations at the 2014 Anděl Awards.

In 2015 the band gave a special concert at the Colours of Ostrava festival with the Janáček Philharmonic Orchestra and the Slovak violinist Stano Palúch.

Band members 
 Jan Unger / lead vocals, guitar, flute
 Jan Juklík / guitar, vocals
 Jan Fišer / violin, vocals
 Jan Caithaml / bass guitar, vocals
 Ondřej Slavík / drums, accordion, beatbox, vocals

Discography 
 Voní, 2009
 Hrdina počítačový hry jde do světa, 2011
 Soundtrack ke konci světa, 2012
 Kolik váží vaše touha, 2012
 Následuj kojota, 2014
 Čtyři Honzové a jeden Ondřej v severní části Střeleckého ostrova (Live), 2015
 Jiskřící, 2017
 Spící (EP), 2018
 Zrní a Filharmonie HK živě ve Foru Karlín (Live), 2019
 Nebeský klid, 2020

References 

Czech alternative rock groups